Clutieae was a tribe of plant of the family Euphorbiaceae. It comprised 2 genera, Clutia and Kleinodendron. Clutia is now included in the family Peraceae, and Kleinodendron is included in the family Phyllanthaceae

See also
 Taxonomy of the Euphorbiaceae

References

Acalyphoideae
Euphorbiaceae tribes
Historically recognized angiosperm taxa